Waldon is a surname. Notable people with the surname include:

Alton Waldon (born 1936), American politician
Billy Ray Waldon (born 1952), American murderer
Connor Waldon (born 1995), English footballer
Keith Waldon, English football manager

See also
Waldon, California, unincorporated community in California, United States
Walden (disambiguation)